Joe Robert Greenhill (July 14, 1914 – February 11, 2011) was an American attorney. He served on the Texas Supreme Court for 25 years, 10 of those as chief justice.

Biography
Born in Houston, Texas, Greenhill attended the University of Texas, where he earned Bachelor of Arts and Bachelor of Business Administration degrees in 1936 and a Bachelor of Laws degree in 1939 where he was a member of the Texas Cowboys. During World War II, he served as junior officer in the United States Navy, first in intelligence and then as executive officer of a mine sweeper in the Pacific Theater. He became Assistant Attorney General of the State of Texas in 1948, co-founded Graves, Dougherty & Greenhill in 1950 and was appointed to the Texas Supreme Court in 1957, where he served until 1982. He received an honorary Doctor of Law degree from Southern Methodist University in 1977.

Greenhill was of counsel at Baker Botts.

References

External links
 Greenhill, Joe R. biography at Texas Politics (University of Texas) 
 Joe R. Greenhill biography at BakerBotts.com
  In Memoriam: Chief Justice Joe R. Greenhill

1914 births
2011 deaths
20th-century American judges
United States Navy personnel of World War II
Chief Justices of the Texas Supreme Court
Lawyers from Houston
Justices of the Texas Supreme Court
United States Navy reservists
University of Texas School of Law alumni
People associated with Baker Botts
20th-century American lawyers
United States Navy officers